Edwin Eugene Lockhart (July 18, 1891 – March 31, 1957) was a Canadian-American character actor, playwright, singer and lyricist. He became an American citizen in 1939.

Early life
Born in London, Ontario, he made his professional debut at the age of six when he appeared with the Kilties Band of Canada. He later appeared in sketches with Beatrice Lillie.

Lockhart was educated in Canadian schools and at the London Oratory School in London, England. He also played football for the Toronto Argonauts.

Stage
Lockhart had a long stage career; he also wrote professionally and taught acting and stage technique at the Juilliard School of Music in New York City. He had also written theatrical sketches, radio shows, special stage material, song lyrics and articles for stage and radio magazines.

He made his Broadway debut in 1916, in the musical  The Riviera Girl. He was a member of the traveling play The Pierrot Players (for which he wrote the book and lyrics). This play introduced the song, The World Is Waiting for the Sunrise, for which Lockhart wrote the lyrics along with Canadian composer Ernest Seitz.  (The song was subsequently made popular by Les Paul and Mary Ford in the 1950s.) He wrote and directed the Broadway musical revue Bunk of 1926. He sang in Die Fledermaus for the San Francisco Opera Association. On Broadway, Lockhart originated the roles of Uncle Sid in Eugene O'Neill's only comedy, Ah, Wilderness! (1933), and Fortesque in Arthur Schwartz's Virginia (1937). In 1949 he took over from Lee J. Cobb as Willy Loman, during the original run of Arthur Miller's Death of a Salesman.

Film work
Since his death, Lockhart's legacy as a stage actor has been eclipsed by his noteworthy work on the screen. He made his film debut in Smilin' Through (1922) as the Rector, but he made few additional appearances during the silent era. His sound debut was in the film By Your Leave (1934), where he played the playboy Skeets. Lockhart subsequently appeared in more than 300 motion pictures. He often played villains, including a role as the treacherous informant Regis in Algiers (1938), the American remake of Pepe le Moko, which gained him an Academy Award nomination for Best Supporting Actor. He also played the suspicious Georges de la Trémouille, the Dauphin's chief counselor, in Joan of Arc (1948), starring Ingrid Bergman. He had a great succession of "good guy" supporting roles including Bob Cratchit in A Christmas Carol (1938) and Judge Harper in Miracle on 34th Street (1947).

Upon the arrival of Orson Welles in Hollywood in 1940, Lockhart wrote a short poem satirizing Welles entitled "Little Orson Annie". The poem was a parody of the 1885 poem "Little Orphant Annie" by James Whitcomb Riley.

Lockhart is remembered as the Starkeeper in Carousel (1956). Playing a bumbling sheriff, he appeared in His Girl Friday (1940) opposite Cary Grant and Rosalind Russell.  He also appeared in the movie The Sea Wolf (1941), adapted from the novel by Jack London, as a ship's doctor. His last film role was that of the Equity Board President in the film Jeanne Eagels (1957).

Recognition
Lockhart has two stars on the Hollywood Walk of Fame—one for motion pictures, at 6307 Hollywood Boulevard, and one for television at 6681 Hollywood Boulevard. Both were dedicated February 8, 1960.

Personal life

Lockhart was married to actress Kathleen Lockhart from June 12, 1924, until his death. They had one child together, actress June Lockhart, through whom he is the grandfather of actress Anne Lockhart.

Death
Lockhart died April 1, 1957, from a coronary thrombosis at the age of 65 in St. John's Hospital, Santa Monica, California. He is buried next to his wife in  Holy Cross Cemetery, Culver City.

Filmography

Smilin' Through (1922) as Village Rector (film debut)
The No Man (1933, Short)
Paul Revere, Jr. (1933, Short) as Miles Standish (uncredited)
By Your Leave (1934) as Skeets
The Gay Bride (1934) as Jim Smiley (uncredited)
Captain Hurricane (1935) as Capt. Jeremiah Taylor
I've Been Around (1935) as Sammy Ames
Storm Over the Andes (1935) as Cracker
Star of Midnight (1935) as Horatio Swayne
Thunder in the Night (1935) as Police Lt. Gabor
Crime and Punishment (1935) as Lushin
The Garden Murder Case (1936) as Lowe Hammle
Brides Are Like That (1936) as John Robinson
The First Baby (1936) as Mr. Ellis
Times Square Playboy (1936) as P.H. "Ben"/"Pig Head" Bancroft
Earthworm Tractors (1936) as George Healey
The Gorgeous Hussy (1936) as Maj. William O'Neal
The Devil Is a Sissy (1936) as Mr. Murphy
Wedding Present (1936) as Archduke Gustav Ernest
Come Closer, Folks (1936) as Elmer Woods
Career Woman (1936) as Uncle Billy Burly
Mind Your Own Business (1936) as Bottles
Mama Steps Out (1937) as Mr. Sims
Too Many Wives (1937) as Winfield Jackson
The Sheik Steps Out (1937) as Samuel P. Murdock
Something to Sing About (1937) as Bennett O. "B.O." Regan
Algiers (1938) as Regis
Of Human Hearts (1938) as Quid
Sinners in Paradise (1938) as Senator Corey
Stock and Blondes (1938, Short)
Men Are Such Fools (1938) as Bill Dalton
Penrod's Double Trouble (1938) as Mr. Frank Schofield
Meet the Girls (1938) as Homer Watson
Listen, Darling (1938) as Mr. Drubbs
Blondie (1938) as C.P. Hazlip
A Christmas Carol (1938) as Bob Cratchit
Sweethearts (1938) as Augustus
I'm from Missouri (1939) as Porgie Rowe
The Story of Alexander Graham Bell (1939) as Thomas Sanders
Hotel Imperial (1939) as Elias
Tell No Tales (1939) as Arno
Bridal Suite (1939) as Cornelius McGill
Our Leading Citizen (1939) as J.T. Tapley
Blackmail (1939) as William Ramey
Geronimo (1939) as Gillespie
His Girl Friday (1940) as Sheriff Peter B. Hartwell
Abe Lincoln in Illinois (1940) as Stephen Douglas
Edison, the Man (1940) as Mr. Taggart
We Who Are Young (1940) as C.B. Beamis
South of Pago Pago (1940) as Lindsay
Dr. Kildare Goes Home (1940) as George Winslow
A Dispatch from Reuter's (1940) as Otto Bauer
Keeping Company (1940) as Mr. Hellman
Meet John Doe (1941) as Mayor Lovett
The Sea Wolf (1941) as Dr. Prescott
Billy the Kid (1941) as Dan Hickey
One Foot in Heaven (1941) as Preston Thurston
International Lady (1941) as Sidney Grenner
The Devil and Daniel Webster (1941) as Squire Slossum
They Died with Their Boots On (1941) as Samuel Bacon, Esq.
Steel Against the Sky (1941) as John Powers
Juke Girl (1942) as Henry Madden
The Gay Sisters (1942) as Herschell Gibbon
You Can't Escape Forever (1942) as Carl Robelink
Forever and a Day (1943) as Cobblewick
Hangmen Also Die (1943) as Emil Czaka
Mission to Moscow (1943) as Premier Molotov
Find the Blackmailer (1943) as John M. Rhodes
Northern Pursuit (1943) as Ernst
Madame Curie (1943) (uncredited)
The Desert Song (1943) as Pere FanFan
Action in Arabia (1944) as Josef Danesco
Going My Way (1944) as Ted Haines Sr.
Man from Frisco (1944) as Joel Kennedy
That's the Spirit (1945) as Jasper Cawthorne
The House on 92nd Street (1945) as Charles Ogden Roper
Leave Her to Heaven (1945) as Dr. Saunders
Meet Me on Broadway (1946) as John Whittaker
A Scandal in Paris (1946) as Prefect of Police Richet
The Strange Woman (1946) as Isaiah Poster
The Shocking Miss Pilgrim (1947) as Saxon
Honeymoon (1947) as Consul Prescott
Miracle on 34th Street (1947) as Judge Henry X. Harper
Cynthia (1947) as Dr. Fred I. Jannings
The Foxes of Harrow (1947) as Viscount Henri D'Arceneaux
Her Husband's Affairs (1947) as Peter Winterbottom
The Inside Story (1948) as Horace Taylor
I, Jane Doe (1948) as Arnold Matson
Apartment for Peggy (1948) as Prof. Edward Bell
Joan of Arc (1948) as Georges de la Trémoille
That Wonderful Urge (1948) as Judge Parker
Down to the Sea in Ships (1949) as Andrew L. Bush
The Sickle or the Cross (1949) as James John
Madame Bovary (1949) as J. Homais
Red Light (1949) as Warni Hazard
The Inspector General (1949) as The Mayor
Riding High (1950) as J.P. Chase
The Big Hangover (1950) as Charles Parkford
I'd Climb the Highest Mountain (1951) as Jeff Brock
Rhubarb (1951) as Thaddeus J. Banner
Texas Lady (1951) as Judge George Jeffers
A Girl in Every Port (1952) as Garvey
Hoodlum Empire (1952) as Senator Tower
Down Among the Sheltering Palms (1953) as Rev. Paul Edgett
Bonzo Goes to College (1952) as Clarence B. Gateson
Apache War Smoke (1952) as Cyril R. Snowden
Face to Face (1952) as Capt. Archbold ('The Secret Sharer')
Tales of Tomorrow (1952, TV) as Prof. Vanya 
Androcles and the Lion (1952) as Menagerie Keeper
Confidentially Connie (1953) as Dean Edward E. Magruder
The Lady Wants Mink (1953) as Mr. Heggie
Francis Covers the Big Town (1953) as Tom Henderson
World for Ransom (1954) as Alexis Pederas
The Father Who Had No Sons (1955, TV Movie) as Milton Hershey
The Vanishing American (1955) as Blucher
Carousel (1956) as Starkeeper/Dr. Selden
The Man in the Gray Flannel Suit (1956) as Bill Hawthorne
Science Fiction Theatre (1956, TV)  as Dr. Richard Hewitt/Dr. Elwood Dove
Telephone Time (1956, TV) as Louis P. Cashman 
Jeanne Eagels (1957) as Equity Board President (final film)

See also

List of actors with Academy Award nominations

References

Sources
 "Gene Lockhart of Stage, Screen Actor of Supporting Roles Dies — Had First Broadway Part in 1916", New York Times, April 1, 1957.

Further reading
  (Includes an interview with Lockhart's daughter, June)

External links

 

Sheet music for "The World is Waiting for the Sunrise", Chappell-Harms, 1919.
Go Abroad with the Lockharts on The Digital Deli Too -- information about a radio program that starred Gene Lockhart and his wife, Kathleen

1891 births
1957 deaths
American male film actors
American Roman Catholics
Canadian male film actors
Canadian male singers
Canadian Roman Catholics
Canadian lyricists
Male actors from London, Ontario
Musicians from London, Ontario
Burials at Holy Cross Cemetery, Culver City
Deaths from coronary thrombosis
People educated at London Oratory School
People with acquired American citizenship
Toronto Argonauts players
Juilliard School faculty
20th-century American male actors
20th-century Canadian male actors
20th-century American singers
20th-century Canadian male singers
Canadian emigrants to the United States
20th-century American male singers